Johnny Messner may refer to:
Johnny Messner (musician) (1909–1986), American big band/swing bandleader
Johnny Messner (actor) (born 1970), American actor